Gilmar Miguel Iser (born 28 August 1964 in Vera Cruz, Rio Grande do Sul) is a retired Brazilian professional football player, who played as defender and currently a manager.

Career as a player
Began his professional career in the Santa Cruz-RS in 1983. Later he played for the teams: Lajeadense, Santo André, Caxias, Guarani-VA, Internacional, Marítimo and Brasil de Pelotas, where he finished his career in 1997.

Career as a manager
Since 1998 he coached the Lajeadense, São José-RS, Pelotas, Avenida, Cachoeira, Novo Hamburgo, Joinville, Glória, Esportivo, Juventude, Caxias, América de Natal, Brasil de Pelotas and River Plate.

Titles
 Cachoeira
 Campeonato Gaúcho Série B: 2001
 Novo Hamburgo
 Copa FGF: 2005
 Copa Emídio Perondi: 2005

Joinville
 Campeonato Catarinense Série B: 2007

References

External links
 Official blog 
 
 Profile at Soccerpunter.com

1964 births
Living people
Association football defenders
Brazilian footballers
Futebol Clube Santa Cruz players
Clube Esportivo Lajeadense players
Esporte Clube Santo André players
Sociedade Esportiva e Recreativa Caxias do Sul players
Sport Club Internacional players
C.S. Marítimo players
Grêmio Esportivo Brasil players
Brazilian football managers
Clube Esportivo Lajeadense managers
Esporte Clube Avenida managers
Esporte Clube São José managers
Esporte Clube Pelotas managers
Esporte Clube Novo Hamburgo managers
Joinville Esporte Clube managers
Grêmio Esportivo Glória managers
Clube Esportivo Bento Gonçalves managers
Esporte Clube Juventude managers
Sociedade Esportiva e Recreativa Caxias do Sul managers
América Futebol Clube (RN) managers
Grêmio Esportivo Brasil managers